The Prix International de Géographie Vautrin Lud, known in English as the Vautrin Lud Prize, is the highest award in the field of geography. Established in 1991, the award is named after the 16th Century French scholar . The award is given in the autumn of each year at the International Geography Festival in Saint-Dié-des-Vosges, France (the home town of Vautrin Lud) and decided upon by a five-person international jury.

Recipients

See also

 List of geography awards
 International Geographical Union
 Victoria Medal
 Murchison Award
 Hubbard Medal

References

External links

http://findarticles.com/p/articles/mi_qn4158/is_19981001/ai_n14191789
https://web.archive.org/web/20071216151242/http://www.geog.ucla.edu/news.php
http://www.ia.ucsb.edu/pa/display.aspx?pkey=1683
http://www.csiss.org/SPACE/about/news.php
https://web.archive.org/web/20080706145855/http://www.colorado.edu/news/releases/2000/492.html
http://www.utdallas.edu/news/archive/2005/berry-lud.html 
http://www.fig.saint-die-des-vosges.fr/en 

Geography awards

Awards established in 1991
1991 establishments in France

de:Festival international de géographie#Lauréat Prix International de Géographie Vautrin Lud